On March 23 2013, a battle took place in Gao between MUJAO and Malian army. The Malian army repelled the attack.

The battle
On March 23, the Malian and French forces conduct a search operation on the island of Bera, capturing nine people suspected to be connected to MOJWAO. A few hours later, on the night of March 23–24, a MOJWAO fighters raided the city of Gao, defended by the Malian, Nigerian and French armies based at Gao airport, as well as 160 Guinean soldiers who arrived in the city three days earlier. During the fighting, MOJWAO retreated, but later returned in the battle by the Niger river. The fighting ended when city residents took up arms against the Islamists. During the battle, four Islamist were killed, and two wounded, as well as 1 Malian soldier killed, and four wounded. Four civilians were also killed.

References

2013 in Mali
Conflicts in 2013
Battles involving France
Gao Region
Mali War
Battles post-1945
March 2013 events in Africa

Battles in 2013